Sara Seiler (born January 25, 1983) was a forward for the Carleton Ravens women's ice hockey program of U Sports women's ice hockey. She was a member of the German team that competed at the 2013 IIHF Women's World Championship and in Ice hockey at the 2014 Winter Olympics – Women's tournament.

Playing career
In 2006-07, Seiler played for the Ottawa Raiders of the original NWHL, logging five assists in 32 regular season games.

Carleton Ravens
Sara Seiler was the first European in the history of the Carleton Ravens women's ice hockey program to have the captaincy bestowed upon her. In preparation for the 2013 IIHF Women's World Championship, the Carleton Ice House served as the training facility for the Germany women's national ice hockey team. Former Ravens team captain Sara Seiler served as a member of the German squad.  Of note, the Ravens hosted Germany in an exhibition game, which saw the Germans prevail by a 3-0 tally, with goals from Julia Zorn, Franziska Busch, Andrea Lanzl.

International
She was also on the German women's Olympic ice hockey team that competed in the 2006 Winter Games in Torino, Italy. She was chosen to participate in the first International Ice Hockey Federation (IIHF) High Performance Women's Camp in Bratislava, Slovakia from July 5–12, 2011. She represented Germany at said camp, which intends to improve the quality of women's ice hockey.

See also
 Germany women's national ice hockey team

References

1983 births
German women's ice hockey forwards
Ice hockey players at the 2006 Winter Olympics
Ice hockey players at the 2014 Winter Olympics
Living people
Olympic ice hockey players of Germany
People from Miesbach (district)
Sportspeople from Upper Bavaria